Krishan Dinidu (full name Rankoth Gedara Krishan Dinidu Dananjaya; born 3 June 1990) is a Sri Lankan cricketer. He is a right-handed batsman and right-arm medium-fast bowler who plays for Panadura Sports Club. He was born in Panadura.

Having represented the Under-23 team since the 2005 season, he made his List A debut during the 2009–10 season, against Sri Lanka Air Force Sports Club. From the upper-middle order, he scored 19 not out.

He made his Twenty20 debut for Panadura Sports Club in the 2017–18 SLC Twenty20 Tournament on 24 February 2018.

References

External links
Krishan Dinidu at CricketArchive 

1990 births
Living people
Sri Lankan cricketers
Panadura Sports Club cricketers